Kunwara Baap may refer to:
Kunwara Baap (1942 film)
Kunwara Baap (1974 film)